William Conyers, 1st Baron Conyers (21 December 1468 – 14 April 1524), also known as William Conyers of Hornby, was an English baron and aristocrat.

Personal life
Conyers was the second, but only surviving son of Sir John Conyers, Jr. (d.1469) of Hornby, Yorkshire, and Lady Alice Neville, daughter of William Neville, 1st Earl of Kent.  His father, having been killed in battle when he was under a year old, Conyers thus succeeded to the family estates on the death of his grandfather, Sir John Conyers, on 14 March 1489/90. He extensively rebuilt Hornby Castle in Swaledale, Yorkshire, which Conyers had inherited. His first wife was Mary Scrope, the daughter of Sir John Scrope, 5th Baron Scrope of Bolton, and Elizabeth St John, and the half-cousin of King Henry VII of England, through her maternal grandmother, Margaret Beauchamp of Bletso. His second wife was Lady Anne Neville, daughter of Ralph Neville, 3rd Earl of Westmorland, and Isabel Booth. Another wife, though where she fits is unknown, was apparently Maud Percy, youngest daughter of the 5th Earl of Northumberland

He served the King on several military expeditions to Scotland, and also fought at the Battle of Flodden in 1513.

Titles
Conyers was created Baron Conyers on 17 October 1509.  He was succeeded by Christopher Conyers, 2nd Baron Conyers, one of his sons by Lady Anne Neville. His daughter, Katherine Conyers (d. 1566), married Sir Francis Bigod.

Ancestry

Notes

References

1524 deaths
Year of birth unknown
1468 births
People from Ryedale (district)
15th-century English people
16th-century English nobility
Barons Conyers